Typhoon Ida, also known as the , was the sixth-deadliest typhoon to hit Japan, as well as one of the strongest tropical cyclones on record. On September 20, Ida formed in the Western Pacific near Guam. It moved to the west and rapidly intensified into a  typhoon by the next day. On September 22, Ida turned to the north and continued its quick rate of intensification. This made Ida the strongest tropical cyclone on record at the time, although it was surpassed by Typhoon June 17 years later. Ida weakened as it continued to the north-northeast, and made landfall in Japan on southeastern Honshū with winds of 80 mph on September 26. It became extratropical the next day, and dissipated on the 28th to the east of the country. Ida caused torrential flooding to southeastern Japan, resulting in over 1,900 mudslides. Damage was estimated at $50 million, and there were 1,269 fatalities.

Meteorological history

Tropical Storm Ida formed east of Guam on September 20, 1958. The storm moved westward, crossing the island as it gradually intensified into a typhoon. On September 22, Ida began a motion to the north, following a path typical of September typhoons. Around that time, the Hurricane Hunters reported that the eye was obscured, and over the subsequent 24 hours the eyewall remained incomplete.

By less than 36 hours after its peak intensity, aircraft reported that the eye had become filled with clouds, which indicated weakening. The typhoon crossed the eastern portion of the country and emerged from Fukushima Prefecture into the Pacific Ocean. Early on September 27, Ida became extratropical, and its remnants moved through Sapporo and the Kuril Islands before dissipating late on September 28.

Ida retained its status as the most intense typhoon until 1973, when Typhoon Nora attained the same minimum pressure.

Impact

While Typhoon Ida was striking Japan, it produced heavy rainfall that reached  on Mount Amagi on the Izu Peninsula. In the capital city of Tokyo, the storm dropped almost  of rainfall, which was the highest daily total since record-keeping began in 1876. Across the country, the rains caused flooding along the Kano, Merugo, and Arakawa rivers; the flooding of the Kano River destroyed to villages along the Izu Peninsula. The rains resulted in at least 1,900 landslides, including 786 in the Tokyo area. Along the coast, there were 32 ships that were missing or sunk, and another 20 were damaged.

A report by Time Magazine in early October 1958 referred to Ida as the worst Japanese typhoon in 24 years, since the 1934 Muroto typhoon. In the Tokyo area, the storm caused widespread power outages and severely disrupted the transportation system. During the storm, communications were severed with the Izu Peninsula, where damage was heaviest. Across the country, more than 520,000 homes were flooded, which is the most on record. As a result, the Japan Meteorological Agency gave Ida the special local name of the "Kanogawa Typhoon". The typhoon damaged 16,743 homes to some degree, including 2,118 that were destroyed and another 2,175 that were severely damaged. Although it was initially reported that the storm left about 500,000 people homeless, the total was later lowered to 12,000 people left homeless due to the storm. In addition, the typhoon destroyed more than 244 road or rail bridges. Overall damage was estimated at $50 million (1958 USD), or 20.6 billion yen. Overall, the typhoon injured 1,138 people and killed a total of 1,269 people. This makes Ida the sixth-deadliest storm in the country, behind Typhoon Ruth in 1951, Typhoon Marie in 1954, Typhoon Ida in 1945, the 1934 Muroto typhoon, and Typhoon Vera in 1959. Included in the death toll were 381 people that were missing and presumed killed.

After the storm subsided, the United States military provided supplies and soldiers to assist in relief work. About 200 firemen along the Kano River assisted in relief efforts.

See also

Other storms of the same name
Significant typhoons with special names
Typhoon Alice (1958)
Typhoon Hagibis (2019)

References

External links

1958 Pacific typhoon season
Typhoons
Typhoons in Japan